Below is a list of Galician language exonyms for places in non-Galician-speaking areas :

Austria 
 Wien – Viena
 Salzburg – Salsburgo

Armenia 
 Yerevan – Iereván

Azerbaijan (Acerbaixán) 
 Baku – Bakú

Belarus (Bielorrusia)

Belgium (Bélxica) 
 Antwerpen – Antuerpen
 Brugge – Bruxas
 Brussel/Bruxelles – Bruxelas
 Leuven – Lovaina
 Liège – Liexa

Bosnia and Herzegovina (Bosnia e Hercegovina) 
 Sarajevo – Saraxevo

Bulgaria 
 Sofia – Sofía

Croatia (Croacia)

Cyprus (Chipre) 
 Lefkosia – Nicosia
 Lémesos – Limasol

Czechia (Chequia) 
 Prague (Praha) – Praga

Denmark (Dinamarca) 
 København – Copenhaguen

Estonia 
 Tallinn – Talín

Finland (Finlandia) 
 Helsinki – Helsinqui

France (Francia) 
 Avignon – Aviñón
 Bordeaux – Bordeos
 Carcassonne – Carcasona
 Le Havre – O Havre
 Lyon – Lión
 Marseille – Marsella
 Nice – Niza
 Paris – París
 Perpignan – Perpiñán
 Rennes – Renes
 Rouen – Ruán
 Strasbourg – Estrasburgo
 Toulouse – Tolosa
 Versailles – Versalles

Georgia (Xeorxia)

Germany (Alemaña) 
 Aachen – Aquisgrán
 Augsburg – Augsburgo
 Berlin – Berlín
 Bonn – Bon
 Dresden – Dresde
 Duisburg – Duisburgo
 Freiburg – Friburgo
 Göttingen – Gotinga
 Hamburg – Hamburgo
 Hannover – Hannóver
 Koblenz – Coblenza
 Cologne (Köln) – Colonia
 Magdeburg – Magdeburgo
 Mainz – Maguncia
 Munich (München) - Múnic
 Nuremberg (Nürnberg) – Núremberg
 Oldenburg – Oldemburgo
 Trier – Tréveris
 Tübingen – Tubinga
 Wolfsburg – Wolfsburgo

Gibraltar (Xibraltar)

Greece (Grecia) 
 Athína – Atenas
 Irákleio – Heraclión
 Pireias – O Pireo
 Thessaloniki – Tesalónica

Hungary (Hungría)

Iceland (Islandia) 
 Reykjavík – Reiquiavik

Ireland (Irlanda) 
 Dublin/Baile Átha Cliath – Dublín

Italy (Italia) 
 Assisi – Asís
 Bergamo – Bérgamo
 Bologna – Boloña
 Florence (Italian Firenze) – Florencia
 Genoa (Genova) – Xénova
 Mantua (Mantova) – Mantua
 Milan (Milano) – Milán
 Modena – Módena
 Naples (Napoli) – Nápoles
 Padua (Padova) – Padua
 Pavia – Pavía
 Ravenna – Rávena
 Sassari – Sácer
 Taranto – Tarento
 Teramo – Téramo
 Torino – Turín
 Venice (Venezia) – Venecia

Latvia (Letonia)

Lithuania (Lituania)

Luxembourg (Luxemburgo)

Malta 
 Valletta – A Valeta

Monaco (Mónaco)

Netherlands, The (Países Baixos) 
 Amsterdam – Ámsterdam
 Den Haag – A Haia
 Groningen – Groninga
 Nijmegen – Nimega
 Rotterdam – Róterdam

Norway (Noruega)

Poland (Poland) 
 Kraków – Cracovia
 Warszawa – Varsovia

Portugal 
 Bragança – Braganza

Romania (Romanía) 
 București – Bucarest
 Constanța – Constanza

Russia (Rusia) 
 Kaliningrad – Kaliningrado
 Moskva – Moscova
 Sankt Peterburg – San Petersburgo
 Volgograd – Volgogrado
 Yekaterinburg – Ecaterimburgo

Serbia 
 Beograd – Belgrado

Slovakia (Eslovaquia)

Slovenia (Eslovenia) 
 Ljubljana – Liubliana

Spain (España) 
 Badajoz – Badaxoz
 Cartagena – Cartaxena
 Ciudad Real – Cidade Real
 Girona – Xirona
 Getafe – Xetafe
 Gijón – Xixón
 Guadalajara – Guadalaxara
 Jaén – Xaén
 Jerez – Xerez

Sweden (Suecia) 
 Göteborg – Gotemburgo
 Stockholm – Estocolmo

Switzerland (Suíza) 
 Basel - Basilea
 Bern – Berna
 Fribourg/Freiburg – Friburgo
 Genève – Xenebra
 Lausanne – Lausana
 Luzern – Lucerna
 St. Gallen – San Galo
 Zürich – Zúric

Turkey (Turquía) 
 Ankara – Ancara
 Istanbul – Istambul
 Izmir – Esmirna

Ukraine (Ucraína) 
 Kyiv – Kiev

United Kingdom (Reino Unido) 
 Edinburgh – Edimburgo

See also 
 List of European exonyms

Exonym
Lists of exonyms
Exonym